Chaparhar is a district in the centre of Nangarhar Province, Afghanistan. Its population, which is 100% Pashtun, was estimated at 54,858 in 2002, of whom 21,800 were children under 12. The district is within the heartland of the Shinwari tribe of Pashtuns, but there are many other tribes there as well, the most prominent of which are Daulatzai and Taraki. The district centre is the village of Chaparhar.

References

External links
 Map of Chaparhar district (PDF)

Districts of Nangarhar Province